Kim Young-chan (born 4 September 1993) is a South Korean footballer who plays as centre back for Gyeongnam FC in K League 2.

Career
Kim was selected by Jeonbuk Hyundai in the 2013 K League draft.

He moved to Daegu FC on loan on 9 July but made only 6 appearances in Daegu.

On 21 January 2014, Suwon FC confirmed a loan signing of Kim.

Personal life 
On 11 December 2021, Kim married Lee Ye Rim, the daughter of actor and comedian Lee Kyung Kyu.

References

External links 

1993 births
Living people
Association football defenders
South Korean footballers
Jeonbuk Hyundai Motors players
Daegu FC players
Suwon FC players
FC Anyang players
Gyeongnam FC players
Bucheon FC 1995 players
K League 1 players
K League 2 players